Raja Club Athletic (Arabic: نادي الرجاء الرياضي, romanized: Nādī ar-Rajāʾ ar-Riyāḍī) commonly referred to as Raja CA, is a professional sports club based in Casablanca, Morocco.

This chronological list comprises all those who have managed the club since its foundation on 20 March 1949. Each president's entry includes his dates of tenure, the significant achievements accomplished under his care and some remarks concerning his spell.

Raja CA is owned and run by its members (in Arabic: المنخرطين) since its founding. They elect the president in a general assembly. The president has the responsibility for the overall management of the club, including formally signing contracts with players and staff.

 is the longest-serving president of the club (9 years, from 1992 to 1998 and from 2007 to 2010). He's also, tied with Ahmed Ammor, the most successful president (6 trophies). Overall, the club has had 26 different presidents throughout its history.

History 

The longest-serving president is Abdellah Rhallam (1992-1998, 2007–2010).  is the one who had the longest spell (1969-1978). The shortest one goes to  who left his post in 1969 after less than a year.

The founders (1949-1960) 
Elected on March 20, 1949, the Franco-Algerian  is the first president in the club's history, although he's not actually among the founders. Owner of a contract drafting office in Derb Sultan, he was suggested by his Algerian friend Rihani to circumvent the French law who prohibited, at the time of the Protectorate, the presidency of a sports club to a Moroccan citizen.

Meanwhile, Moulay Sassi Aboudarka Alaoui is designated honorary president. Ben Abadji remains the first and only non-Moroccan president. In its early years, Raja was managed by presidents who belonged to the founding assembly, such as Boujemaâ Kadri and Laâchfoubi El Bouazzaoui.

The unionists (1960-1989) 

In 1959, the Istiqlal Party witnessed a historic split from the left-wing and progressive side led by Abderrahim Bouabid, Abdallah Ibrahim and Mehdi Ben Barka from the conservative and nationalist heart of the Party, led by Allal El Fassi and Ahmed Balafrej, giving birth to the National Union of Popular Forces. This new class had the support of a number of youth organizations, in particular the sports and worker youth of the Moroccan Workers' Union (UMT), at the time the only trade union center in Morocco.In 1960, UMT became the main sponsor of Raja CA, which became in some way its representative on the football pitch and many members of the union played for the club.

After a recomposition of the committee during the 1961 general assembly, several personalities who have greatly contributed to the club were awarded with honorary status :

 Abdallah Ibrahim
 Abderrahim Bouabid
 Maâti Bouabid
 
 
 Ahmed Laski
 Mohamed Abderrazak
 Mohamed Ben Saleh
 Mohamed El Alami

The « wise council » (1989-2012) 
With , they formed the « wise council », an advisory committee at the disposal of the president. After the resignation of Abdesalam Hanat,  was elected on June 7, 2012, at the head of the club, and became, at the age of 28, the youngest president of club's history. He arrived with large financial resources and promised a new era.

Modern era (2012-) 
Coming to the end of his four-year term, Mohamed Boudrika was replaced in June 2016 by Said Hasbane who stated upon his arrival that the club was in financial crisis. On April 6, 2018, due to popular pressure from supporter and club members, Said Hasbane resigned from his position.

Former president  set up a provisional committee to manage the club until the end of the season. On September 13, 2018,  is elected new president of Raja CA. He promises to continue the work of the previous committee, adding that he will do his best to get the club out of his financial crisis.

On November 15, 2020, Ziyat met his committee by video-conference to inform them of his decision to end his mandate. On December 14, 2020,  succeeded him as an interim president.

Unanimously elected in June 2022,  is the twenty-third and current president of Raja CA.

President designation 
It is the members who elect by vote, the president of the Raja Club Athletic at the end of the general assembly, whether it's ordinary or extraordinary.

The ordinary general meeting takes place every year and has as main objectives the discussion and approval of the moral and financial reports of the past season, and the election of a new president if the mandate of the outgoing one comes to an end or if the committee resigns. The extraordinary general assembly is held in case of emergency under the request of the majority of the members or of the president himself.

The club's internal law set no limit to the number of terms allowed for the president, and set the length of a term at four years. However, no president has been directly re-elected for a second consecutive term since Abdelouahed Maâch in 1974 (Abdesalam Hanat was re-elected in 2003 but after a one-year term). Since 1998, only Ahmed Ammor and Mohamed Boudrika have completed their four-year terms.

In the case of a resignation of the president, article 23 of chapter 4 of the club's law say that the first vice-president, if he expresses the will and if no candidate appears, will preside the club on interim until the next assembly.

Committee 
Article 23 states: "In addition to the president, the management committee must contain between 9 and 15 members. Among them are elected: a first and a second vice-president, a general secretary and his assistant, a treasurer and his assistant and between 3 and 9 advisers.

The president have to constitute his committee and announcing it within a period which generally does not exceed fifteen days according to article 20 of the club's statutes. All club positions, including president, are honorary and without any financial compensation.

In 2020, Société anonyme Raja Club Athletic is created under the supervision of the Minister of Youth and Sports with a capital divided into 3000 shares. The Raja Club Athletic association is the majority shareholder of the S.A with 2984 shares, while a single share is granted as a loan to each member of the committee, then 16 in number. The shares do not belong to them, once a member leaves the committee, he must transfer his share to the association, that means that no one really owns the share.

List of presidents 
Below is the official presidential history of Raja CA, from Hajji Ben Abadji until the present day.

References

External links
 

Presidents
Presidents
Moroccan football chairmen and investors